Farm House II is a 2014 Chinese animated family adventure comedy film directed by Kerr Xu. It was released on October 1 in China.

Voice cast
Shen Dawei
Feng Junhua
Cu Cu
Liu Yuxuan
Yang Menglu
Xia Lei
Xie Tiantian
Su Xin
Ni Kang
Wang Yuhang
Yang Ou
Hai Fang

Box office
By October 7, the film had earned ¥17.01 million at the Chinese box office.

References

2010s adventure comedy films
2014 animated films
2014 films
Animated comedy films
Animated adventure films
Chinese animated films
2014 comedy films